Stephen Carroll (born 30 November 1993) is an Irish footballer who plays for Detroit City in the USL Championship.

Career

Early career
Carroll played in his native Ireland with Wilton United, also playing both football and Gaelic football with Ballincollig until he was 16-years old, before joining the Cork City academy. He appeared on the bench for Cork's senior team in 2012, before going on loan to College Corinthians in the Munster Senior League. A spell at Carrigaline United in the Munster First Division followed in 2013, who he helped to promotion.

College in the United States
In 2014, Carroll was recruited by Martin Methodist College in Pulaski, Tennessee and offered a scholarship. In his first game at Martin Methodist, Carroll dislocated his knee and requires surgery. He played 20 games in 2015, scoring five goals and was named First Team All-Southern States Athletic Conference.

Carroll transferred to Davenport University in 2016, where he went on to make 55 appearances over three seasons, scoring eight goals and tallying two assists. In 2016, Carroll was named First Team All-Wolverine Hoosier Athletic Conference, 2017 saw him named GLIAC Defensive Player of the Year and First Team All-GLIAC whilst helping the Panthers to the GLIAC championship, and was named on the D2CCA All-Midwest Region first team.

In 2016, Carroll played with amateur side Muskegon Risers.

Detroit City
In 2017, Carroll made the move to amateur side Detroit City FC, who at the time competed in the NPSL. He remained with the club through to 2020 in the NPSL, as well as their spell in the NISA, winning numerous titles with the club.

On 10 January 2022, Carroll was re-signed by Detroit as they made the move to the fully-professional USL Championship.

References

External links
NISA bio
Davenport bio
 

1993 births
Living people
Republic of Ireland association footballers
Republic of Ireland expatriate association footballers
Expatriate soccer players in the United States
Association football defenders
Cork City F.C. players
Detroit City FC players
National Premier Soccer League players
National Independent Soccer Association players
USL Championship players
Carrigaline United A.F.C. players